Jemangmaega (Korean: 제망매가; Hanja: 祭亡妹歌) is a hyangga written by a Buddhist monk named “Wolmyeongsa” in the ancient Korean kingdom of Silla. The poem was included in Samguk Yusa, a collection of folklore from the Three Kingdoms Period. The poem still remains one of the most popular Korean works of literature today.

The poem's title “Jaemangmaega” roughly translates to “A Requiem for a Dead Sister.” Consequently, the poem is about the author mourning his sister's death in a regretful and sad tone. A variety of figurative expressions such as similes, metaphors, and philosophical statements related to death are present in the work.

Legend 
It is believed that the poem was written during the deceased sister's jesa, a traditional Korean funeral. Legend states that upon  writing the poem on a piece of paper, a strong gust of wind flew the paper westwards. In Korean and Buddhist folklore, a paper flying towards the west means that the wish on the paper has been granted.

Original Text 
This is how the poem was written in the original Samguk Yusa:
生死路隠
此矣有阿米次肹伊遣
吾隐去内如辝叱都
毛如云遣去内尼叱古
於內秋察早隠風未
此矣彼矣浮良落尸葉如 / 一等隠枝良出古
去奴隠處毛冬乎丁
阿也
彌陁刹良逢乎吾 / 道修良待是古如

Translation

Citations 

Korean poetry
Korean folklore
Chinese-language literature of Korea